Daniyar Kaisanov (born 18 July 1993) is a Kazakhstani freestyle wrestler. He is a two-time gold medalist at the Asian Wrestling Championships, a silver medalist at the Asian Games and a bronze medalist at the World Wrestling Championships. He also represented Kazakhstan at the 2020 Summer Olympics held in Tokyo, Japan.

Career 

He represented Kazakhstan at the 2018 Asian Games and he won the silver medal in the men's 74kg event. In the final, he lost against Bekzod Abdurakhmonov of Uzbekistan.

He won the gold medal in the men's 74 kg event at the 2019 Asian Wrestling Championships held in Xi'an, China. In 2020, he also won the gold medal in the men's 74 kg event at the Asian Wrestling Championships held in New Delhi, India.

In 2019, he competed at the World Wrestling Championships in the men's 74kg event. At the time he didn't win the bronze medal but he was awarded one of the bronze medals after Zelimkhan Khadjiev tested positive for doping. As a result, he qualified to represent Kazakhstan at the 2020 Summer Olympics in Tokyo, Japan. In March 2021, he won one of the bronze medals in the 74 kg event at the Matteo Pellicone Ranking Series 2021 held in Rome, Italy. In June 2021, he won one of the bronze medals in the men's 74 kg event at the 2021 Waclaw Ziolkowski Memorial held in Warsaw, Poland.

He lost his bronze medal match against Bekzod Abdurakhmonov of Uzbekistan in the men's 74kg event at the 2020 Summer Olympics held in Tokyo, Japan.

Achievements

References

External links 
 

Living people
1993 births
Place of birth missing (living people)
Kazakhstani male sport wrestlers
Wrestlers at the 2018 Asian Games
Asian Games medalists in wrestling
Asian Games silver medalists for Kazakhstan
Medalists at the 2018 Asian Games
World Wrestling Championships medalists
Asian Wrestling Championships medalists
Wrestlers at the 2020 Summer Olympics
Olympic wrestlers of Kazakhstan
21st-century Kazakhstani people